Ismael Laguna Meneses (born June 28, 1943, in Colón, Panama) is a former professional boxer. He was inducted into the International Boxing Hall of Fame in 2001.

Professional career

Known as "El Tigre Colonense", Laguna  was the World Lightweight Champion in 1965 and later regained the belt in 1970, but he was stripped of his WBC title prior to losing the WBA Title to Ken Buchanan.

Laguna also lost 15 round decisions in two other bids to regain his lightweight title, in 1967 against Carlos Ortiz, and in 1971 to Ken Buchanan.  He retired after the loss to Buchanan in 1971.

Laguna was inducted into the International boxing hall of fame in 2001.

Professional boxing record

Other honors
Inducted into the International Boxing Hall of Fame (2001).
Inducted into the World Boxing Hall of Fame (1999).

See also
Lineal championship
List of world lightweight boxing champions

References

External links

|-

|-

|-

|-

|-

|-

1943 births
Living people
Panamanian male boxers
Sportspeople from Colón, Panama
Afro-Panamanian
International Boxing Hall of Fame inductees
Lightweight boxers
World lightweight boxing champions
World Boxing Association champions
World Boxing Council champions
The Ring (magazine) champions